One of a Kind is the eighteenth studio album by American country music singer-songwriter Tammy Wynette. It was released on November 14, 1977, by Epic Records.

Commercial performance 
The album peaked at No. 32 on the Billboard Country Albums chart. The album's only single, "One of a Kind", peaked at No. 6 on the Billboard Country Singles chart.

Track listing

Personnel
Adapted from the album liner notes.
Bill Barnes - album design
Lou Bradley - engineer
Ken Laxton - engineer
Bill McElhiney - string arrangement
Judy Mock - photography
The Nashville Edition - backing vocals
Billy Sherrill - producer
Bergen White - string arrangement
Tammy Wynette - lead vocals

Chart positions

Album

Singles

References

1977 albums
Tammy Wynette albums
Epic Records albums
Albums produced by Billy Sherrill